

Burton upon Stather, also hyphenated as Burton-upon-Stather, is a  village and civil parish in North Lincolnshire, England. The civil parish consists of Burton upon Stather and the hamlets of Normanby and Thealby; its population at 2001 was 2,737, increasing slightly to 2,753 at the 2011 census.

History
The term Stather is of Danish origin and implies a landing-stage.

Up to 1914, the river landing was used as a calling place by steamers between Gainsborough and Hull.

A large slipway of concrete and wood to the north of Burton Stather was built in 1944 by the 79th Armoured Division (United Kingdom). It was used for testing and training with amphibious  Duplex Drive tanks during the Second World War.

In 2009 a voluntary group was set up to protect, restore and provide access to the old Tank Ramp on the River Trent.

Community
The Grade I listed Anglican parish church is dedicated to St Andrew. It was initially built in 1160, and had a tower added in 1230. The church was restored and altered in 1865, and restored again in 1889; remaining features are Perpendicular. There are monuments saved and removed from Owston resited within the church: an effigy of a knight with sword brought from Boston, a cannonball from the Battle of Solebay, and many monuments of the Sheffield family.

Burton Playing Fields is a section of land on the outskirts of the village, with facilities including a children's play area, a basketball court, various sports fields and a pavilion. It is also used for training and play by various local football teams.

The village received press attention over the issue of whether or not to have wind turbines built locally.

References

External links

 Burton upon Stather Parish Council website
 Burton upon Stather Heritage Group website

Civil parishes in Lincolnshire
Villages in the Borough of North Lincolnshire